Atemahawke is the debut album of Mexican surrealist rock band Porter, released on May 15, 2007. To date, the only single released is "Host of a Ghost". The name consists of an English phonetic translation of Nahuatl for Guadalajara, Ātemaxac . Each of the album's songs have a back story which are printed in the album, giving further explanation to the lyrics. The album was later named the 3rd best of the decade by Latin music website Club Fonograma. This is the band's last release with vocalist Juan Son.

Following the album's release, Porter performed at Al Borde's Rock N' Bliss in Hollywood, California on October 12, 2007, the band's first performance outside of Mexico. The band would later perform at the 2008 Coachella Festival with Natalia Lafourcade performing "Host of a Ghost" on stage with the band. Shortly after the performance at Coachella, Porter became inactive and broke up before reforming in 2013 with vocalist David Velasco.

Track listing

Personnel
Porter
Juan Son – vocals
Victor "Villor" Valverde – guitar, piano
Fernando "Fehr" de la Huerta – guitar
Diego "Bacter" Rangel – bass, synthesizer, programming
Juan Pablo "Chata" Vázque – drums

Additional
Odín Parada – producer, bajo sexto, bateria, keyboards
Alex Pérez – producer, bajo sexto, bateria, keyboards, programming
Ron Boustead – mastering
Jesus Cabrera – violin, viola

References

2007 debut albums
Porter (band) albums